The Batasan–San Mateo Road, also known as the IBP–San Mateo Road and formerly as the Constitutional Road, is a four-lane east–west highway connecting Quezon City and San Mateo, Rizal in the Philippines. 

The road begins at the intersection with the Batasan Road in Batasan Hills, Quezon City adjacent to the Batasang Pambansa complex. It passes through the areas of Filinvest II Subdivision which also includes Northview I and II, the former site of Batasan Hills Elementary School, San Antonio de Padua Church, a temple of the Church of Jesus Christ of Latter-day Saints, a branch of Puregold Jr. adjacent to the temple, Sunnyside Hills Subdivision, the Batasan-San Mateo Bridge crossing the Marikina River, Felicidad Village in San Mateo and ends at the intersection with General Luna Street. It is continued to the east by C-6 Bypass Road.

References

Roads in Rizal
San Mateo, Rizal
Streets in Quezon City